Bar is a reality show aired by the commercial television station Pop TV, in which contestants live in the same house for three months and compete against each other to see who can run a bar the best. With a small payment, viewers can follow the events of the show live on the show's website, as more than 20 cameras follow the everyday lives of the contestants. POP TV plays a recap of the day's events every evening except Sundays.

Each Wednesday, competitors rate each other's performance by assigning each other either pluses or minuses. The competitor who receives the most minuses, and the contestant chosen by the one with the most pluses, find themselves in the "hot seat" and must compete against each other on Saturday night. Viewers vote by telephone which one of the contestants will remain in the show. The competitor with the lowest number of votes must leave the bar. The bar manager directs the competitors.

Season 1
Competitors have run the local AS Lounge in Knafelj underpass in Ljubljana. The bar manager was Gaber Žgavc, the host is Bastjan Kepic .

Start Date: 25 September 2005.
End Date: 17 December 2005.
Duration: 84 days.
Prize: 5,000,000 SIT (20,846 EUR) + Car

Contestants

Nominations

Season 2
Competitors have run the basement pub Centre Bachus in Congress Square in Ljubljana.
In the second season, the contestants were originally divided into two groups ("white" and "black"). The groups were disbanded after opening the envelopes in the sixth week of the competition. When at the end of the sixth week of the show had to move rider Tina, she was replaced by her twin sister Ines.

Name: Bar II.
Start Date: 23 September 2006.
End Date: 16 December 2006.
Duration: 85 days.
Prize: 12,000,000 SIT (50,000 EUR)

Contestants

* Twin sisters

Nominations

Season 3
Denis Vikić will be the Bar manager and the prize will be 50.000 €. The Bar will be located in Ljubljana at the top of a building.

Name: Bar 2015.
Start Date: 2 March 2015.
End Date: 13 June 2015.
Duration: 104 days.
Prize: 50,000 Euro

Contestants

Nominations

Notes
 : There was a tie with 3 positives each between Črt and Joel, so they voted again between them: Črt (Rene, Suzana, Tanja & Vita) Joel (Danijel, Emi, Eva, Miloš & Sanja), so Joel with 5 votes is the positive this week.
 : On day ?, the contestants voted to keep one of the 3 intruders. with 5 votes Ivona was the chosen (I don't have who voted who).
 : Denis as bar manager, decided to keep Kim, so Nataša was evicted.
 : There was a tie between Kim and Vita with 3 negatives, so they voted again. but Kim was chosen as the first nominee.
 : Nejc received the most negatives, with a total of 7/10, however he was part of a secret mission, as he had to receive the most negatives in order to be safe (he won immunity only for this vote, he can still be chosen on Saturday). A new vote was done, and Emi was chosen as the negative this week..
 : There was a tie with 2 positives between Črt, Joel & Suzana, so a second round for both votes was done: Črt (Dolores/Ivica, Ivona, Suzana & Tanja), Joel (Črt) & Suzana (Damjan, Joel, Emi, Nejc & Sanja). With 5 votes, Suzana is the positive.
 : There was a tie with 3 negatives between Ivona & Nejc, so a second round for both votes was done: Ivona (Damjan, Sanja & Suzana) & Nejc (Dolores/Ivica, Črt, Joel, Emi & Tanja). With 5 votes, Nejc is the minus and the first nominee.
 : On April 19, Dolores decided to leave the show because she was missing her child and the person who was taking care of him had to leave. Ivica stayed in the apartment and competed as a single contestant.
 : Danijel, Eva & Miloš returned to the Bar this week to help the other contestants and they had to give joint a Plus/Minus vote: Emi and Sanja.
 : Danijel, Eva & Miloš vote: Črt and Joel.
 : Denis, the Bar Manager, chose the best barman of the week who will receive an extra plus. For this week, he chose Joel.
 : Danijel, Eva & Miloš vote: Črt and Ivona.
 : Denis, the Bar Manager, chose the best barman of the week who will receive an extra plus. For this week, he chose Suzana.
 : There was a tie with 2 positives between Črt & Suzana and 2 negatives between Joel & Suzana, so a second round for both votes was done: Črt (Danijel/Eva/Miloš & Joel) & Suzana (Manager & Ivona). There was a tie again, so Črt is the positive for not having received any minus. On negative: Joel (Ivona & Danijel/Eva/Miloš) & Suzana (Črt). Joel is the minus.

References

Swedish reality television series
2005 Slovenian television series debuts
2006 Slovenian television series endings
2000s Slovenian television series
Slovenian reality television series
Pop (Slovenian TV channel) original programming